Samuel Di Carmine (born 29 September 1988) is an Italian professional footballer who plays as a striker for  club Perugia.

Career
Di Carmine, a powerful striker, made his Serie A debut on 25 October 2006 away to Torino in a 1–0 win. He scored his first goal with the viola in a 2007–08 UEFA Cup match, the final goal in a clear 6–1 win to IF Elfsborg on 8 November 2007.

On 1 July 2008, Championship side Queens Park Rangers, owned by Italian Formula One mogul and businessman Flavio Briatore, signed Di Carmine on loan for the 2008–09 season.

On 28 October 2008, Di Carmine scored his first league goal for Queens Park Rangers, scoring in the 54th minute against Birmingham.

On 19 August 2009, he was loaned to Serie B club Gallipoli. Two days later, he played his first game for the club, substitute William Pianu in the second half. The match ended in a 1–1 draw with Ascoli.

Di Carmine was signed by Serie B club Frosinone in co-ownership deal for a peppercorn fee of €500.

On 7 July 2011, Di Carmine joined Cittadella. Cittadella bought 50% registration rights from relegated Frosinone. He was expected to replace Federico Piovaccari as team topscorer. Eventually Nunzio Di Roberto was the topscorer with 10 goals, and Di Carmine 1 goal short with 9 goals.

In the summer of 2013, he moved to S.S. Juve Stabia. Despite the club relegated from Serie B, he remained with the club.

Di Carmine was loaned out to Hellas Verona from Perugia for the 2018–19 season. He helped the team clinch promotion to Serie A with his 11 league goals and Verona signed him on a permanent contract ahead of the 2019–20 season.

On 28 January 2021, Di Carmine joined Crotone on loan until the end of the 2020–21 season.

On 24 August 2021, he signed a two-year contract with Cremonese.

On 1 September 2022, Di Carmine returned to Perugia.

References

External links
 
 FIGC 
 

Living people
1988 births
Footballers from Florence
Association football forwards
Italian footballers
Italy under-21 international footballers
Italy youth international footballers
Italian expatriate footballers
Expatriate footballers in England
Italian expatriate sportspeople in England
ACF Fiorentina players
Queens Park Rangers F.C. players
A.S.D. Gallipoli Football 1909 players
S.S. Juve Stabia players
Frosinone Calcio players
A.C. Perugia Calcio players
Virtus Entella players
Hellas Verona F.C. players
F.C. Crotone players
U.S. Cremonese players
Serie A players
Serie B players
Serie C players
English Football League players